Kersey is an English surname. It originated as a habitational surname from Kersey, Suffolk. Other spellings of the surname include Kearsey, Keresey, and Kiersey. The variant spelling Carsey may also be found in the United States. The 2011 United Kingdom census found 911 people with this surname. Notable people with the surname include:

Clyde Kersey (born 1937), American politician
Eda Kersey (1904–1944), British violinist
Graham Kersey (1971–1997), English cricketer
Hannah Kersey (born 1983), British woman with two wombs, gave birth to triplets in 2006
Jess Kersey (born 1941), American basketball referee
Jerome Kersey (1962–2015), American basketball player 
John Kersey the elder (1616–1690?), English author
John Kersey the younger (fl. 1720), English philologist and lexicographer
Ken Kersey (1916–1983), Canadian jazz pianist
Mark Kersey (born ), American politician
Paul Kersey (disambiguation)
Ron Kersey (1949–2005), American disco keyboardist and music producer
Thomas Kersey (1847–1888), United States Navy sailor
Alex Kersey-Brown (born 1940), Welsh rugby player

References

English-language surnames